David Zachary (Zach) Hambrick is a psychology professor at Michigan State University, known for his research on the effects of practice on proficiency in various skills. Hambrick's research has concluded that practice is important in explaining ability in fields such as chess, music, and academics, but less so than argued by other psychologists, notably K. Anders Ericsson. Hambrick contends that, in addition to amount of practice, working memory capacity is associated with better performance on a wide variety of tasks.

References

External links
Faculty page

Living people
Michigan State University faculty
Methodist University alumni
Georgia Tech alumni
American cognitive psychologists
Experimental psychologists
Intelligence researchers
Year of birth missing (living people)